Leifeng Pagoda is a five story tall tower with eight sides, located on Sunset Hill south of the West Lake in Hangzhou, Zhejiang, China. Originally constructed in the year AD 975, it collapsed in 1924 but was rebuilt in 2002. Since then, it has become a popular tourist attraction.

History

Original
The original pagoda was built in 975 AD, during the Five Dynasties and Ten Kingdoms period, at the order of King Zhongyi (Qian Chu) of Wuyue for his favorite concubine, Consort Huang. The Leifeng Pagoda was an octagonal, five-story structure built of brick and wood with a base built of bricks.

During the Ming dynasty, Japanese pirates attacked Hangzhou. Suspecting the pagoda contained weapons, they burned its wooden elements, leaving only the brick skeleton, which can be seen from Ming paintings of the West Lake.

Leifeng Pagoda was one of the ten sights of the West Lake because of the Legend of the White Snake.  In the Chinese folk story “The Legend of White Snake”, the monk Fahai deceived Xu Xian to Jinshan, and the White Lady ran into Jinshan to rescue Xu Xian, and was suppressed by Fahai under the Leifeng Pagoda.

Later, due to a superstition that the bricks from the tower could repel illness or prevent miscarriage, many people stole bricks from the tower to grind into powder. On the afternoon of September 25, 1924, the pagoda finally collapsed due to disrepair. At that time Lu Xun wrote two articles commenting on this event, using the pagoda to symbolize the collapse of pedantic traditional Chinese thoughts and expressing his hope for the future society. Xu Zhimo and Yu Pingbo also wrote poems and articles to commemorate the pagoda.

As for whether there was a mausoleum below, this was debated for years until radar was used to investigate. On March 11, 2001, the mausoleum was excavated and many artifacts were found, most notably a gold and silver coated hair of the Buddha.

Reconstruction
In October 1999, the provincial and municipal governments decided to rebuild Leifeng Pagoda on top of the ruins of the old one. The new pagoda opened on 25 October 2002. It is composed of a 1400 tonne steel structure with 200 tonnes of copper parts. It contains four sightseeing elevators, and modern amenities such as air conditioning, television, and speakers. At the entrance of the pagoda, there are two autonomous escalators to carry visitors to the base of the pagoda.

The original base of the pagoda is kept in good condition, as well as the artifacts discovered in the underground chamber.

References

  (English subtitle)
The history and culture of the Leifeng Pagoda - MildChina.com
https://web.archive.org/web/20080806083444/http://www.hz-west-lake.cn/
https://web.archive.org/web/20111004022122/http://www.visithangzhou.com/cmarter.asp?doc=1105
http://www.chinadaily.com.cn/english/doc/2003-10/13/content_336626.htm
Hangzhou West Lake: Too many places, too little time

Buddhist temples in Hangzhou
Pagodas in China
975 establishments
10th-century establishments in China
Wuyue architecture